Niklas Bosserhoff (born 15 April 1998) is a German field hockey player who plays as a defender for Bundesliga club Hamburger Polo Club and the German national team.

He competed in the 2020 Summer Olympics.

Club career
Bosserhoff came through the youth ranks of Uhlenhorst Mülheim and played in the senior team with whom he won two Bundesliga titles. He was a total of 19 years at the club until 2022 when he left Mülheim for Hamburger Polo Club.

References

External links

1998 births
Living people
Field hockey players at the 2020 Summer Olympics
German male field hockey players
Olympic field hockey players of Germany
German people of American descent
Sportspeople from Boston
Male field hockey defenders
HTC Uhlenhorst Mülheim players
Men's Feldhockey Bundesliga players
21st-century German people